Hopewell High School may refer to:

Jamaica
 Hopewell High School, Jamaica

United States
 The Hopewell School, a former high school in Dubach, Louisiana
 Hopewell High School (North Carolina), in Charlotte, North Carolina
 Hopewell High School (Pennsylvania), in Aliquippa, Pennsylvania
 Hopewell High School (Virginia), in Hopewell, Virginia
 Hopewell High School Complex, the former high school campus in Hopewell

See also
 Hopewell School (disambiguation)